Keter (Keṯer, lit. "crown") also known as Kether, is the topmost of the sephirot of the Tree of Life in Kabbalah. Since its meaning is "crown", it is interpreted as both the "topmost" of the Sephirot and the "regal crown" of the Sephirot. It is between Chokhmah and Binah (with Chokhmah on the right and Binah on the left) and it sits above Tiferet. It is usually given three paths, to Chokhmah, Tiferet and Binah.

Keter is so sublime, it is called in the Zohar "the most hidden of all hidden things", and is completely incomprehensible to man. It is also described as absolute compassion, and Moses ben Jacob Cordovero describes it as the source of the 13 Supernal Attributes of Mercy.

Keter is invisible and colorless.

Description

According to the book Bahir:
"What are the ten utterances? The first is supreme crown, blessed be His name and His people."

The first Sephirah is called the Crown, since a crown is worn above the head. The Crown therefore refers to things that are above the mind's abilities of comprehension. All of the other Sephirot are likened to the body which starts with the head and winds its way down into action. But the crown of a king lies above the head and connects the concept of "monarchy", which is abstract and intangible, with the tangible and concrete head of the king.

This first Sefirah represents the primal stirrings of intent in the Ein Soph (infinity), or the arousal of desire to come forth into the varied life of being. But in this sense, although it contains all the potential for content, it contains no content itself, and is therefore called 'Nothing', 'The Hidden Light', 'The air that cannot be grasped'. Being desire to bring the world into being, Keter is absolute compassion.

The name of God associated with Keter is Ehyeh Asher Ehyeh (Hebrew: אהיה אשר אהיה), the name through which he revealed himself to Moses from the burning bush.

Keter, although being the highest Sephirah of its world, receives from the Sephirah of Malkuth of the domain above it (see Sephirot). The uppermost Keter sits below no other Sephirah, although it is below Or Ein Soph which is the source of all Sephirot.

Qualities

Ethical behaviour
Moses ben Jacob Cordovero, in The Palm Tree of Devorah, discusses ethical behaviour that man should follow, related to the qualities of the Sephirot, in order that man might emulate his Creator. Humility is the first, because although Keter is the highest, it is ashamed to look at its cause, and instead gazes at those below it. One's thoughts should be pure, one's forehead should display no harshness, one's ears should always turn to hear good, one's eyes should distance themselves from noticing evil, always looking at the good, one's nose should be free from the breath of anger, one's face should always shine, and his mouth should express nothing except good.

Thirteen Attributes of Mercy 

Through discussion of a line in the Michah, 13 attributes are associated with the Sephirah Kether:

Who is God like you, who pardons iniquity and forgives the transgressions of the remnant of his heritage? He does not maintain His anger forever, for He delights in kindness. He will again show us compassion, He will vanquish our iniquities, and You will cast all their sins into the depths of the sea. Show faithfulness to Ya'akov, kindness to Avraham, which You have sworn to our fathers from days of old. (Michah, 7:18-20)

Accordingly, the 13 attributes are derived from this and are described in great detail.

Additionally, the "Thirteen Attributes of Mercy" were described by Rabbi Chizkiyah in an allegorical depiction of a lily among thorns. The metaphor in whole is known and taught as "The lily amongst the thorns," a phrase found in Shir Hashirim 2:2. A summary:

The secret of spiritual protection is revealed through a richly metaphorical discourse given by Rabbi Chizkiyah. The Rabbi explains that the spiritual forces that protect and watch over us are called the 13 Attributes of Mercy. They are transmitted into our physical world through the first 13 words of the Torah. When judgments are decreed against us, these 13 forces can safeguard us from their influence. We begin drawing this Light of protection to ourselves at the very moment we begin to browse and behold the mystical shapes and sequences of the Aramaic text, and to learn the spiritual insights presented there.

Non-Jewish practices 

In The Mystical Qabalah Dion Fortune describes Keter as pure consciousness, beyond all categories, timeless, a point that crystallises out of the Ein Soph, and commences the process of emanation that ends in Malkuth.

The name of God given to it is Eheieh, the archangel that presides over it is Metatron, the order of angels that resides in it are the Holy Living Creatures (the Chaioth ha Qadesh, Hebrew: חיות הקדש), and its mundane chakra is said to be the First Swirlings of the cosmos (Primum Mobile, Rashith ha Gilgalin).

A.E. Waite made mention that Rabbi Azariel ben Menachem, a student of Isaac the Blind, in his Commentary on the Sephiroth granted a particular colour to each Sephira, yet these do not agree with the colours given in the Zohar, where Kether (which, according to him, is also correlated to Yechidah) is called colourless, Tiphareth purple, and Malkuth sapphire-blue.

As pure formless consciousness, it is often compared with the Sahasrara chakra, which resides above the crown of the head, in Indian Shakta Tantra.

In Aleister Crowley's Liber 777, Keter is associated with the Four Aces of the Tarot deck, White Brilliance, Poseidon, Brahma, Wodan, Zeus, The Trinity, Almond in flower, Diamond, Elixir Vitae, Dao, and Death.

Furthermore, Crowley associates the qliphothic demonic order of Thaumiel with Kether. Thaumiel in turn is associated with (or "ruled by") the demons Satan and Moloch. These same demons are also associated with Ghagiel and Sathariel, the upper triad.

Keter is also identified with the planets Neptune or Pluto, the Atma in Theosophy and Raja Yoga, and the Khabs am Pekht in Egyptian mysticism.

In popular culture
In the SCP Foundation mythos and related media, "Keter" is one of the primary classifications for anomalous objects or entities. Specifically, the "Keter" classification denotes objects or entities that are exceedingly difficult to reliably contain.

References

Jewish 
Bahir, translated  by Aryeh Kaplan, (1995). Aronson.
 Lessons in Tanya
 Kabbalah 101: Keter
The Kabbalah Handbook, A Concise Encyclopedia of Terms and Concepts in Jewish Mysticism 
 Moshe Cordovero, The Palm Tree of Devorah, translated by Moshe Miller (1993). Targum Press Inc.
 Arthur Green, Keter: The Crown of God in Early Jewish Mysticism (2014). Princeton University Press.

Non-Jewish

External links 
Basics in Kabbalah, The Ten Sefirot: Keter (inner.org)
An Introduction to the Kabala (about.com)
Tree of Life: Keter (psyche.com)

Sephirot
Kabbalistic words and phrases